The (Arena) Tour was the fifth concert tour by American country music duo Dan + Shay, in support of their eponymous album and Good Things. The tour first began in Nashville on March 6, 2020, until it briefly was postponed after March 8, 2020 due to the COVID-19 pandemic. The tour resumed in Greenville on September 9, 2021, and ended in Boston on December 7, 2021.

Background
On October 4, 2019, the duo first released a collaboration with Justin Bieber titled "10,000 Hours". Days after the single release, the duo announced tour dates for North America. The Band Camino and Ingrid Andress were announced as opening acts. On March 12, 2020, after performing in Columbus, the duo announced the tour would be postponed to summer and fall 2020. Dates were postponed again to 2021, which also led to some cancellations after they were unable to reschedule from 2020 postponements.

Set list

Tour dates

Cancelled shows

References

2020 concert tours
Concert tours postponed due to the COVID-19 pandemic
2021 concert tours